Lone, historically known as Lavanya is a Kashmiri surname found in the Indian administered union territory of Jammu and Kashmir and the Pakistani administered province of Azad Kashmir. Kashmiris with this surname are also found in other parts of India and in the Pakistani Punjabi areas of Lahore, Gujranwala and Sialkot.

Background
Scholars like Jan Gonda and Walter Roper Lawrence have stated that the Lone belong to the Vaishya order, being Hindu agriculturalists and traders prior to their conversion to Islam. 

In the view of Kalhana:

In narrating the war of extermination by which Harsa, endeavoured to rid the eastern portion of the valley of the powerful Damaras. Kalhana indiscriminately also uses the term LAVANYA to designate them. This becomes quite evident by a comparison of the verses quoted below. The same observation holds good for a series of passages in later portions of the Chronicle. The explanation is not far to seek. Lavanya, as shown in note vii. 1171, is a tribal name still surviving to this day in the Kram name Lun, born by a considerable section of the agriculturist population of Kashmir.

The Lone Tribe is considered to be the direct descendant of the survived Damaras who later adopted different professions and blended into the Kashmiri  society.

Today The Lone tribe is based mainly in northern Kashmir, Gilgit Baltistan although in the past few centuries there has been gradual diffusion of the tribe throughout the valley of Kashmir. Some members of this caste are also found in the Pakistani-administered Kashmir. However, the place of origin of the tribe and the area where the tribe is said to be mostly concentrated in is the northern Kupwara district of the Kashmir Valley.

Although the vast majority of the Lone tribe speak Kashmiri as their mother tongue, significant numbers speak Shina, especially those who live in the Gurez valley. The majority of the people of the Lone tribe follow Islam as their religion and are predominantly  Sunni Muslims.

References 

Kashmiri tribes
Social groups of Jammu and Kashmir
Social groups of Pakistan